Married 2 America is a 2012 Hindi-language drama film directed by Dilip Shankar featuring Jackie Shroff, Archana Joglekar, Anjali Malhotra, Shweta Tiwari, Raghuveer Yadav, Chetan Pandit in the lead roles. The film was released on 17 February 2012 to mixed reviews.

Summary
Looking into the causes of a dam burst, NRI architect cum engineer Ravi Malhotra goes missing in Bihar. His anxious wife Anjali travels to India in search of her husband. But her quest is fraught with danger.

Cast
 Jackie Shroff as Pratap Singh
 Archana Joglekar as Anjali Malhotra
 Shweta Tiwari as Pratap Singh's wife
 Raghubir Yadav as Raghu
 Chetan Pandit as Ravi Malhotra
 Ashok Samarth as Vishnu
 Akhilendra Mishra
 Ganesh Yadav

Location 
 Jabalpur
 Bargi Dam
 Bhedaghaat
 Narmada Ghaat
 City
 Bargi Forest
 Khandaari Dam
 JNKVV
 United States

Music

References

External links
 
 

2012 films
2010s Hindi-language films
Indian drama films
Films set in Bihar
2012 drama films
Hindi-language drama films